Cristina H. Amon   is a mechanical engineer, academic administrator and was the 13th dean of the University of Toronto Faculty of Applied Science and Engineering. She was the Faculty's first female dean. Prior to her appointment at the University of Toronto in 2006, she was the Raymond J. Lane Distinguished Professor and director of the Institute for Complex Engineered Systems at Carnegie Mellon University.

Education

Amon graduated with a diploma in mechanical engineering from Venezuela's Simón Bolívar University in 1981. She went on to graduate studies at the Massachusetts Institute of Technology, completing a Master of Science (MSc) in 1985 and a doctor of science (ScD) in 1988.

Research

Amon is a pioneer in the development of computational fluid dynamics (CFD) for thermal design solutions in systems with multidisciplinary competing constraints. She has made contributions to concurrent thermal designs, electronics cooling and transient thermal management of wearable computers and electric vehicles.

Amon leads the University of Toronto's Advanced Thermal/Fluids Optimization, Modelling, and Simulation (ATOMS) Laboratory where she conducts research in nanoscale thermal transport phenomena in semiconductors, energy systems and bioengineered devices. Amon's academic contributions include a number of highly cited book chapters and articles leading to an h-index of over 51.

Career

Amon became an assistant professor in mechanical engineering at Carnegie Mellon University in 1988, and was promoted to associate professor in 1993 and full professor in 1997. In 1998, she was named the Associate Director of the Institute for Complex Engineered Systems, and became its Director in 1999. She became the Raymond J. Lane Distinguished Professor of Mechanical Engineering in 2001.

Her appointment as Dean of the Faculty of Applied Science and Engineering at the University of Toronto began in 2006. She was appointed as Alumni Chair Professor in BioEngineering in the Department of Mechanical and Industrial Engineering at the same time. Amon is the Faculty's first female dean.

Amon is committed to increasing diversity within the engineering profession. In 2017, she was selected as the opening speaker at the Women in Science and Engineering 2017 National Conference. Under Amon's leadership, female enrolment in the first-year cohort at U of T Engineering reached a record 40.1% in 2016.

Amon was also instrumental in bringing the Centre for Engineering Innovation & Entrepreneurship (CEIE) to life. The building will be the future hub of the Faculty's collaborative learning and interdisciplinary research. Construction began in 2015.

Honors and awards

Amon holds a number of honours and awards. She is a life fellow of the American Association for the Advancement of Science and American Society of Mechanical Engineers (ASME). She is a fellow of the Canadian Society for Mechanical Engineering, American Society for Engineering Education (ASEE), and Institute of Electrical and Electronics Engineers. She received several awards from the ASEE, including the prestigious 1997 George Westinghouse and 2002 Ralph Coats Roe Awards. In 2003, she received the Hispanic Engineer National Achievement Education Award and, in 2005, she was named one of America's most important Hispanics in technology and business. In 2006, she was elected as a member into the National Academy of Engineering. In 2015, Amon received the Ontario Professional Engineers Gold Medal from Professional Engineers Ontario and the Ontario Society of Professional Engineers. In 2017, she received the Engineering Institute of Canada's Sir John Kennedy Medal.
 
Her editorship roles include the ASME Journal of Heat Transfer, IEEE Transactions on Components and Packaging Technology, and Frontiers in Heat and Mass Transfer.

Amon is featured in the Notable Women in Computing cards.

References

American mechanical engineers
American people of Venezuelan descent
Living people
Fellows of the American Association for the Advancement of Science
Fellows of the American Society of Mechanical Engineers
Fellows of the American Society for Engineering Education
MIT School of Engineering alumni
Simón Bolívar University (Venezuela) alumni
Carnegie Mellon University faculty
Academic staff of the University of Toronto
Computational fluid dynamicists
Fellow Members of the IEEE
Year of birth missing (living people)
Members of the Order of Canada
People from Montevideo
Women engineers